Interstate 65 (I-65) runs from Ardmore north in Tennessee to just south of Franklin, Kentucky, forming part of the national highway that goes from Mobile, Alabama, to Gary, Indiana. In Tennessee the highway's official name is the Albert Arnold Gore Sr. Memorial Highway, named for Albert Gore Sr., the former US Senator.

I-65 serves the state capital and largest city of Nashville and parallels U.S. Route 31 (US 31) its entire length in Tennessee.

Route description

Southern section and Nashville suburbs
I-65 enters Tennessee from Alabama concurrent with US 31 in rural Giles County near the town of Ardmore. About  later, near the town of Elkton, is an interchange with State Route 7 (SR 7), where US 31 splits off into a concurrency with that route, heading north toward Pulaski. Continuing through mostly rural territory characterized by slight rolling hills, I-65 crosses the Elk River about  later and has an interchange with US 64 about  beyond this point, which serves Pulaski to the west and Fayetteville to the east. Continuing through further rural terrain, I-65 crosses into Marshall County about  later and immediately has an interchange with U.S. Route 31 Alternate (US 31A) near the town of Cornersville, which also serves as a connector to Lewisburg. Bypassing Lewisburg to the west, I-65 enters Maury County about  later. Slightly over  later is an interchange with SR 50, which serves Columbia to the northwest and Lewisburg to the southeast. Bypassing Columbia to the east, I-65 crosses the Duck River about  later and has an interchange with SR 99 and the eastern terminus of US 412 about  later.

Almost  later, I-65 crosses into Williamson County and has an interchange with the eastern terminus of SR 396 (Saturn Parkway), a freeway spur that serves Spring Hill and the General Motors Spring Hill Manufacturing plant.  later, I-65 widens to six lanes and reaches a combination interchange with I-840, which serves as an outer southern bypass of Nashville. I-65 then receives eight lanes from this interchange, with the left lanes serving as high-occupancy vehicle lanes (HOV lanes) during rush hour. About  later, I-65 enters Franklin, one of the principal cities of the Nashville metropolitan area, and has an interchange with the eastern terminus of SR 248. In Franklin, I-65 crosses the Harpeth River and has interchanges with SR 96 (a major arterial route that also serves Murfreesboro to the east), McEwen Drive, Cool Springs Boulevard, and SR 441 (Moores Lane). I-65 then leaves Franklin, enters Brentwood, and has an interchange with SR 253 (Concord Road) a little over  later. Passing through the center of Brentwood, I-65 crosses into Davidson County about  later and immediately has an interchange with SR 254 (Old Hickory Boulevard), which is considered the second Brentwood exit due to its extreme proximity. I-65 then continues into the southern neighborhoods of Nashville.

Nashville and northern section

Entering the southern neighborhoods of Nashville, I-65 has an interchange with SR 255 (Harding Place) about  later. A little over  later, the HOV lane restrictions terminate, and I-65 widens to 10 lanes at an interchange with Armory Drive. The route then crosses SR 155 (Thompson Lane) and has a spaghetti junction four-level stack interchange with I-440, which serves as a southern bypass to downtown Nashville. At this interchange, I-65 reduces to six lanes, and, a little over  later, I-65 enters downtown Nashville and begins a concurrency with I-40. The mile and exit numbers during the concurrency are numbered using I-40's mileage. Forming part of the Downtown Loop, the set of Interstate Highways that encircle downtown Nashville, the routes shift sharply to the east, before shifting to the northwest, and have interchanges with US 70 (Charlotte Avenue) and US 70S/US 431 (Broadway). About  later, I-40 splits off to the west, heading toward Memphis, and I-65 curves sharply to the northeast, reaching an interchange with US 41A (Rosa L. Parks Boulevard) about  later. 

About  later, the route crosses the Cumberland River on the Lyle H. Fulton Memorial Bridge and reaches an interchange with I-24, beginning a concurrency with that route and shifting into a northward direction. Unlike the concurrency with I-40, the I-65 mile and exit numbers are retained during the I-24 concurrency. Carrying eight lanes, the combined routes have an interchange with US 431 (Trinity Lane) just under  later. Almost  later, I-24 splits off, heading northwest toward Clarksville, while I-65 shifts northeast, carrying a total of 10 throughlanes, the left lanes once again functioning as HOV lanes during rush hour. Slightly over  later is a complicated interchange with US 31W/US 41, and SR 155 (Briley Parkway), the latter of which is a freeway that serves as a northern bypass around Nashville. The widest section of I-65 is in Tennessee is found on the north side of this interchange, where the road briefly accommodates 15 throughlanes (eight northbound, seven southbound). The road passes through Madison and has an interchange with SR 45 (Old Hickory Boulevard) about  later. A little over  later, I-65 reaches an interchange with SR 386 (Vietnam Veterans Boulevard) in Goodlettsville, a freeway spur which serves the Nashville suburbs of Hendersonville and Gallatin. At this interchange, I-65 reduces to six lanes, and the HOV restrictions terminate. I-65 then leaves the urban Nashville area and enters Sumner County at this point.

A few miles after leaving the urban Nashville area, at an interchange with SR 174 (Long Hollow Pike), I-65 reduces back to four lanes. Just under  later is an interchange with US 31W/US 41 near the city of Millersville. I-65 then crosses into Robertson County, and,  later, has an interchange with SR 76 in White House, which also serves Springfield to the west. Passing through rural terrain characterized mostly by farmland, I-65 reaches an interchange with SR 25 about  later and then crosses the Red River. I-65 crosses the Red River again almost  later and reaches an interchange with SR 52 about  beyond this point near Portland. About  later, I-65 reaches an interchange with SR 109 northwest of Portland and then crosses into Kentucky about  later.

History

Construction

The southernmost  of I-65 was the first section of Interstate Highway in Tennessee to begin construction and open to traffic after the passage of the Federal-Aid Highway Act of 1956. Work began on this stretch on May 23, 1957, and it was dedicated and opened to traffic on November 15, 1958. Contractor McDowell and McDowell Construction built this stretch, including the figure-eight interchange with US 31 and SR 7, at a cost of $1.3 million (equivalent to $ in ). On July 27, 1965, the short section between the northern interchange with I-24 and US 431 (Trinity Lane) was opened. The stretch between SR 96 in Franklin and SR 255 (Harding Place) in south Nashville was declared complete on December 20, 1965. The last segment between the Alabama state line and Nashville opened on November 22, 1967. 

The  section between US 431 (Trinity Lane) and US 41 (Dickerson Pike) in north Nashville was opened to traffic on December 23, 1968. On June 22, 1970, the  section between SR 25 near Cross Plains and the Kentucky state line, along with the southernmost  in Kentucky, was opened. The  segment between Berry Road, near the present location of the I-440 interchange, and the split with I-40 south of downtown Nashville was opened on October 25, 1972. The  segment of I-65 between US 31W in Millersville and SR 25 near Cross Plains opened on December 15, 1972. The final section of I-65 completed in Tennessee was the approximately  section between SR 255 (Harding Place) and Berry Road, opened to traffic on October 26, 1973.

Later history
Until 2000, the  northern leg of the loop in Nashville was designated as I-265. On April 7, 2000, the I-265 designation vanished, and I-65 itself was rerouted from the southern and eastern half of the loop (where it traveled concurrently with I-24/I-40) to the western and northern half of the loop (where it travels concurrently with I-40 only on the western side and has the northern stretch to itself). Nashville–Davidson County's city/county government had argued to have the designations changed in order to help alleviate traffic congestion caused by motorists following I-65 through the main body of the city. Because of this, the new I-65 route is approximately  longer than the previous route. Milemarkers north of Nashville were not changed with the reroute.

The first HOV lanes in Tennessee opened on September 10, 1993, on the approximately  section of I-65 between Armory Drive in south Nashville and SR 253 in Brentwood with the completion of a project that widened that segment from two to four lanes in each direction. Widening of the  segment between SR 253 and SR 96 in Franklin from two to four lanes in each direction began in May 1996 and was completed in September 1997. This project also included reconstruction of the interchange with SR 248, including widening the route through the interchange and lengthening the ramps.

Reconstruction on the segment of I-65 between US 41 (Dickerson Pike) in north Nashville and SR 45 in Madison between early 2001 and early 2004 widened this segment from three to five lanes in each direction and improved the interchange with Briley Parkway. The section between SR 45 and SR 386 near Goodlettsville was widened from three to five lanes in each direction between early 2002 and late 2005. Work to widen the segment between US 431 (Trinity Lane) through the split with I-24 and US 41 (Dickerson Pike) began in October 2012 and was completed in May 2016.

The approximately  segment south of the Kentucky line was widened to six lanes with the construction of the interchange with SR 109, completed in the spring of 2020. The first phase, which began on September 30, 2021, widens the approximately  segment between south of SR 25 and south of SR 109, and it is expected to be completed before December 2025. At a cost of $160 million, this project is the most expensive individual contract ever awarded by TDOT.

Exit list

Special route 

Interstate 65 Alternate is an alternate route of I-65 running through Robertson and Sumner counties. It was formed to divert traffic from the widening project currently being undertaken from Nashville to the Kentucky state line. It runs along U.S. Route 31W.

Major intersections

See also

References

External links 

 

 Tennessee
65
Transportation in Nashville, Tennessee
Transportation in Davidson County, Tennessee
Transportation in Robertson County, Tennessee
Transportation in Sumner County, Tennessee
Transportation in Williamson County, Tennessee
Transportation in Maury County, Tennessee
Transportation in Marshall County, Tennessee
Transportation in Giles County, Tennessee